The Connecticut Department of Transportation (often referred to as CTDOT and occasionally ConnDOT, or CDOT) is responsible for the development and operation of highways, railroads, mass transit systems, ports and waterways in Connecticut.

CTDOT manages and maintains the state highway system, and runs most of the state's ports along Long Island Sound and the Atlantic Ocean. It oversees the Shore Line East and Hartford Line commuter rail systems under the CTrail brand, and owns the Connecticut section of the New Haven Line used by Metro-North Railroad and Amtrak Northeast Corridor services. CTDOT also oversees the CTtransit bus system, as well as the CTfastrak bus rapid transit service.

Prior to the establishment of the Connecticut Airport Authority in 2011, CTDOT had previously overseen the development and operation of Connecticut's state-owned airports, including Bradley International Airport.

See also

 List of state routes in Connecticut

References

External links
Official website

Newington, Connecticut
Transportation in Connecticut
State departments of transportation of the United States
State agencies of Connecticut
1965 establishments in Connecticut
Government agencies established in 1965